Village of Antwerp Historic District is a national historic district located at Antwerp in Jefferson County, New York.  The district includes 241 contributing buildings, four contributing sites, one contributing structure, and one contributing object.  It encompasses most of the village and includes residential, commercial, civic, and ecclesiastical buildings, a memorial park with monument, two cemeteries, and a stone arch bridge. Most of the buildings were built between 1840 and 1900.

It was listed on the National Register of Historic Places in 2001.

References

Historic districts on the National Register of Historic Places in New York (state)
Historic districts in Jefferson County, New York
National Register of Historic Places in Jefferson County, New York